Bullman is a surname. Notable people with the surname include: 

Gale Bullman (1901–1977), American football player and coach
John Bullman (1870–1922), American jockey
Joseph Bullman, English documentary and drama director
Mike Bullman, American musician